Schnuffel (English: Snuggle, French: Lapin Câlin, Italian: Kikolo, Spanish: Snufi) is an animated rabbit created in 2007 by German media company Jamba!.

Conception and creation 
The first concepts of the Schnuffel character were born on July 2. The original ringtone was turned into a song by Sebastian Nussbaum and Andreas Wendorf and recorded under the title Kuschel Song ("Cuddling song"). The German singing voice of Schnuffel is unknown, although it is known that they were an employee of Jamster. The single was released in February 2008 and quickly topped the German and European charts. After the song went to the top of the Austrian charts and to number 2 in Switzerland, plans were made to release the song internationally. Songs were translated in 13 languages and 13 albums have since been released, including German re-editions and international albums.

Since the creation of Schnuffel, several apps have been created featuring the character, including a "virtual pet" and an educational game.

Schnuffelienchen 
Schnuffel's female counterpart and girlfriend is named Schnuffelienchen, known in English as Snuggelina. Like Schnuffel, she is a lop rabbit. Schnuffelienchen's first CD-single, "Küss mich, halt mich, lieb mich" (Kiss me, hold me, love me) was released on October 29, 2010 and stayed 1 week at the 99th position of the German charts. Her second single, "Schmetterling" (Butterfly) was released on February 28, 2012 only on the Jamba/Jamster sites, and released digitally on Amazon, iTunes and Google Play only on July 25, 2014, together with the English version. Schnuffelienchen's third single "Ohne Dich" (Without You) was released on September 26, 2014 as a digital download.

Achievements
"Kuschel Song" was the fourth best-selling single of 2008 in Germany, and the song received a nomination for Single of the Year at the 2008 Echo Music Awards. In 2013 "Kuschel Song" was chosen by the German TV show Die ultimative Chart Show as the most successful jingle of the new millennium.

Discography

Albums

Singles

Audio books
All of the Schnuffel audio books were produced and written by Kai Hohage.

 2008: Das Geheimnis der Möhre (The Secret of the Carrot)
 2009: Die bezaubernde Prinzessin (The Charming Princess)
 2009: Die kleinen Purzelsterne (The Little Shooting Stars)
 2010: Kuschelbox 1 (containing the first three audio books)
 2010: Der Schatz im Glitzersee (The Treasure in the Glittering Sea)
 2010: Die kleine Schneefee (The Little Snow Fairy)
 2011: Das Baby-Einhorn (The Baby Unicorn)
 2012: Knuddelbox 2 (containing the 4th, 5th and 6th audio books)
 2013: Abenteuer auf der Trauminsel (Adventure on the Dream Island)
 2014: Das Geheimnis der kleinen Eule (The secret of the Little Owl)

References

External links
Schnuffel biography, news and discography at Bubblegum Dancer
 Schnuffel's old YouTube Channel
 Schnuffel's new YouTube Channel
 Schnuffel's official Facebook page
 Schnuffel's website

Advertising characters
Internet memes
Internet humor
Rabbit and hare mascots
Male characters in advertising
German mascots
Internet memes introduced in 2007